The Kid from Borneo is a short subject film in the Our Gang (Little Rascals) comedy series. It was produced and directed by Robert F. McGowan for Hal Roach Studios, and was originally released to theaters by Metro-Goldwyn-Mayer on April 15, 1933. It was the 122nd Our Gang short released, and the 34th talking episode.

Plot
Dickie, Dorothy and Spanky's Uncle George is in town. Uncle George manages a show called "Wild Man from Borneo", featuring a tribal-attired man with the mentality of a seven-year-old child. The children's father refuses to let Uncle George visit, so their mother has the kids visit him at the show's location. Their mother explains to the kids that Uncle George is the black sheep of the family.

The children arrive at the show, where they mistake Bumbo, the Wild Man from Borneo, for their Uncle George. As the children attempt to talk with "Uncle George" and speculate that he might be a cannibal, Bumbo spots Stymie's candy and shouts "Yumm Yumm Eat-Em-Up, Eat-Em-Up!" In an effort to take the candy, Bumbo chases the children (who are now convinced that "Uncle George" is indeed a cannibal) back to their house. Once there, Bumbo repeatedly says “Yumm, yumm, Eat-Em-Up!” while chasing the kids throughout the house. While in the kitchen with Spanky, Bumbo consumes everything in the refrigerator (including an unopened can of sardines, metal opener and all) and a gallon of wine. The now drunk and knife-wielding Bumbo resumes chasing the children, demolishing much of the home's furniture, and repeatedly shouting "Eat-Em-Up, Eat-Em-Up". The children launch several counter-attacks against Bumbo, and after additional damage is done to the house Bumbo retires to a bedroom.

As the mother arrives and asks Spanky where "Uncle George" is, she is directed to the upstairs bedroom. Initially believing the occupant of the bed is the real Uncle George, she screams upon discovering instead the primitive tribesman Bumbo, and is so frightened she jumps head-first out of the second-story window. When the father comes home soon after, Dickie says "Uncle George is upstairs." The dad rolls up his sleeves, vows to punch "Uncle George" in the head (to which Stymie replies, "Oh Yeah?!"), and heads upstairs. Expecting to find Uncle George, he encounters instead Bumbo, who shortly thereafter throws the father out the window. Spanky then blasts Bumbo out the same window with a Roman candle shot to the derrière, and laughs loudly as he watches Bumbo chase his parents down the street.

Cast

The Gang
 Matthew Beard as Stymie
 Tommy Bond as Tommy
 Dorothy DeBorba as Dorothy
 Bobby Hutchins as Wheezer
 George McFarland as Spanky
 Dickie Moore as Dickie
 Dickie Jackson as Dick
 Henry Hanna as Henry
 Pete the Pup as himself

Additional cast
 Harry Bernard as Sideshow manager
 Otto Fries as Kids' Dad
 Dick Gilbert as Worker
 John Lester Johnson as Bumbo, "The Wild Man from Borneo"
 May Wallace as Kids' Mom

See also
 Our Gang filmography
 Wild Men of Borneo

References

External links

1933 films
Films directed by Robert F. McGowan
American black-and-white films
Hal Roach Studios short films
1933 comedy films
Our Gang films
Films with screenplays by H. M. Walker
1933 short films
1930s English-language films
1930s American films